Gage is an unincorporated desert hamlet in western Luna County, New Mexico, United States. It is found on Interstate 10/U.S. Route 70, twenty miles west of Deming.

History
As of 1930, the population was 102. For some time, it survived as a small town, but most of it has now been razed. A traveler's stop with service station and snack shop is all that remains.

References
 The WPA Guide to 1930s New Mexico. University of Arizona Press, 1989.

External links 
 Pictures of Gage, New Mexico as a "ghost town" 

Geography of Luna County, New Mexico
Ghost towns in New Mexico
History of Luna County, New Mexico